Alexander "Ayec" Pimentel is a Filipino politician from the province of Surigao del Sur in the Philippines. He currently serves as a Governor of Surigao del Sur. He was first elected as Governor of the province in 2019. He was also the Mayor of Tandag of the same province from 2004 to 2013 and from 2016 to 2019.

He is the brother of politicians Vicente Pimentel Jr. and Johnny Pimentel.

On September 23, 2020, it was announced that Pimentel tested positive for COVID-19. He was hospitalized on September 28 and was exhibiting mild symptoms.

References

Living people
Governors of Surigao del Sur
PDP–Laban politicians
Mayors of places in Surigao del Sur
Year of birth missing (living people)
21st-century Filipino politicians
Politicians from Surigao del Sur